Donald Messer may refer to:

Donald E. Messer (born 1941), American theologian and author
Don Messer (1909–1973), Canadian musician, band leader, and radio broadcaster